Alive Beyond Recognition is a solo album by former Starcastle drummer Steve Tassler. It was released in 2002 on Sunsinger Records.

Track listing 
The album contains nine tracks.
 "Reunion" – 5:53
 "Liquid Euphoria" – 4:55
 "Firebright" – 6:49
 "And Still She Wonders" – 3:49
 "Bring the Promise" – 4:46
 "Aeon's Arrival" – 4:44
 "Interregnum" – 13:45
 "Foreshadow" – 0:42
 "In the Night" – 6:27

Personnel 
 Steve Tassler – Composition, performances, programming and production.
 Mastering by Jon Schoenoff at Krannert Audio, Urbana, Illinois.
 Art Direction & Design by Dick Detzner

References 

2002 albums